Shipka Valley (Shipchenska Dolina \'ship-chen-ska do-li-'na\) valley extending 2.4 km and 700 m wide in Tangra Mountains, Livingston Island in the South Shetland Islands, Antarctica. The valley descends from Shipka Saddle between the north slopes of Lyaskovets Peak and Levski Peak, and holds a tributary glacier which joins Huron Glacier east of Aheloy Nunatak.

It was first crossed by the Bulgarian Lyubomir Ivanov from Camp Academia  on 17 December 2004, and takes its name from the adjacent Shipka Saddle.

Location

Maps
 L.L. Ivanov et al. Antarctica: Livingston Island and Greenwich Island, South Shetland Islands. Scale 1:100000 topographic map. Sofia: Antarctic Place-names Commission of Bulgaria, 2005.
 L.L. Ivanov. Antarctica: Livingston Island and Greenwich, Robert, Snow and Smith Islands. Scale 1:120000 topographic map.  Troyan: Manfred Wörner Foundation, 2009.

References
 Shipka Valley. SCAR Composite Antarctic Gazetteer
 Bulgarian Antarctic Gazetteer. Antarctic Place-names Commission. (details in Bulgarian, basic data in English)

Tangra Mountains